Franklyn Marks (May 31, 1911, Cleveland, Ohio - July 12, 1976, Sherman Oaks, California) was an American composer and arranger, who worked principally in the idioms of film soundtracks and jazz.

Biography
Early in his career, Marks wrote the song Merry Widow on a Spree for Irving Mills (1937, as Frank Marks), which he also recorded as a pianist with the Millphonics Orchestra. In the same year he played more of his compositions with his own band. In the next few years, he arranged for Charlie Barnet and was involved in the orchestration of the musicals Too Many Girls and Best Foot Forward.

Starting in 1950, Marks wrote compositions for the Stan Kenton orchestra that were oriented towards Latin jazz. His Trajectories were played by Kenton to open his concerts. Kenton also recorded his works Spirals and Evening in Pakistan. Songs by Marks were also recorded by Jerry Lewis, Mel Blanc, Ike Carpenter, Bob Crosby, Laurindo Almeida and Artie Shaw. In 1953 he accompanied Yma Sumac on the piano at the Mocambo-Club in Hollywood.

Concomitantly, Marks worked as a composer and arranger for Hollywood studios, especially for Walt Disney Studios from 1955. Marks had less compositional freedom as a composer for Hollywood, But unlike in the jazz area, he could earn his living there. As a composer, he played for an episode of the Mickey Mouse Club in 1955, from 1956 for 25 episodes of Disneyland, and other Disney television productions. For the cinema, he first orchestrated the music of cartoon, documentary, and feature films of the Disney studios for Paul J. Smith, George Bruns, and Marvin Hamlisch before writing the music for the first film featuring Scrooge McDuck in 1967. He also wrote single film songs, such as "Climb the Mountain" for William Alwyn's soundtrack to Third Man on the Mountain (1959).

Filmography
1956 : How to Have an Accident in the Home
1956 : The Great Locomotive Chase
1956 : Nature's Secrets of Life
1957 : Johnny Tremain
1957 : Perri
1958 : The Light in the Forest
1959 : Sleeping Beauty (uncredited)
1960 : Pollyanna
1961 : 101 Dalmatians
1961 : The Parent Trap
1961 : Babes in Toyland
1961 : The Absent-Minded Professor
1962 : Bon Voyage!
1963 : Miracle of the White Stallions
1963 : The Sword in the Stone
1966 : The Ugly Dachshund
1967 : Scrooge McDuck and Money
1967 : How the West Was Lost
1967 : Charlie, the Lonesome Cougar
1969 : Guns in the Heather
1970 : King of the Grizzlies
1972 : Justin Morgan Had a Horse
1973 : The World's Greatest Athlete
1974 : The Castaway Cowboy

References

External Links
 
 

American composers
Musicians from Cleveland
1911 births
1976 deaths